Ricky (born October 20, year unknown) is a Japanese musician originally from Saitama Prefecture. He is known as the vocalist of bands Dasein and R*A*P, and became the full-time vocalist of Rider Chips in 2005.

Ricky, who claims to have the full name Ricky Astrovich Primakov, also claims that he is an extraterrestrial, specifically one from the planet Iscandar, a planet from the Space Battleship Yamato metaseries. In 2010, Dasein, which went on hiatus in 2003, released a new single to announce a new tour that Ricky became a part of after his tour ended.

Discography

Albums
R☆POP - November 18, 2009 - Marsa/Universal
R☆MUSTER - December 15, 2010 - Marsa/PCI

Singles
 - April 1, 2009
 - July 22, 2009

References

External links
Official website

Japanese male rock singers
Visual kei musicians
Living people
Musicians from Saitama Prefecture
Year of birth missing (living people)